Connecticut Public Broadcasting, Inc. (CPBI), doing business as Connecticut Public or Connecticut Public Broadcasting Network (CPBN) is the parent organization of Connecticut Public Television (CPTV) and Connecticut Public Radio (WNPR). It is a 501(c)(3) nonprofit organization.

History 
The organization was founded in 1962 as Connecticut Educational Television Corporation. Connecticut Public Radio merged in to form Connecticut Public Broadcasting around 1978.

Locations 
The studios and facilities of Connecticut Public Broadcasting are primarily located in Hartford, with a secondary radio studio in New Haven. It has over-the-air television and FM radio transmitters around Connecticut (and one on eastern Long Island, New York), covering most of Connecticut and some neighboring areas.

References

External Links 
 

NPR member networks
PBS member networks